Mark Schuster is the Founding Dean and CEO of the Kaiser Permanente Bernard J. Tyson School of Medicine located in Pasadena, California. Schuster assumed his position in 2017, and the school opened in July 2020. Schuster is a physician-scientist known for his work on child, adolescent, and family health.

Education 
Schuster was born in Baltimore, Maryland and attended the Gilman School. He studied history at Yale University, receiving his B.A. summa cum laude in 1981. In 1988, Schuster obtained his MD and MPP degrees from Harvard Medical School and the Harvard Kennedy School of Government. His master's thesis addressed HIV among injection drug users in Boston. His thesis advisors were Thomas Schelling and Mark Schlesinger. Schuster completed his residency in pediatrics at Boston Children's Hospital before beginning his PhD at the Pardee RAND Graduate School while a Robert Wood Johnson Clinical Scholar at UCLA. Schuster's PhD dissertation studied adolescent sexuality and risk prevention and was presented in 1994. His dissertation committee included Robert Bell, Robert Brook, Phyllis Ellickson, and David Kanouse (Chair).

Career 
Schuster has co-authored over 250 journal articles and two books: Everything You Never Wanted Your Kids to Know About Sex (but Were Afraid They’d Ask): The Secrets to Surviving Your Child’s Sexual Development from Birth to the Teens and Child Rearing in America: Challenges Facing Parents of Young Children. With funding from NIH, AHRQ, and CDC, he has conducted research on topics such as quality of care, health disparities, paid family leave, adolescent sexual health, obesity prevention, HIV prevention, and bullying.

From 1995 – 2007, Schuster was a faculty member at UCLA and reached the level of professor of pediatrics and of health services at the UCLA Schools of Medicine and Public Health. While there, he was also a Senior Natural Scientist at RAND, where he founded and led the UCLA/RAND Health Promotion and Disease Prevention research center and held the RAND Distinguished Chair in Health Promotion. From 2007 - 2017, Schuster served as the William Berenberg Professor of Pediatrics at Harvard Medical School and as the Chief of General Pediatrics and Vice Chair for Health Policy in the Department of Medicine at Boston Children's Hospital. Schuster was the founding director of the Center of Excellence for Pediatric Quality Measurement at Boston Children's Hospital, funded by AHRQ and CMS. Schuster joined Kaiser Permanente Bernard J. Tyson School of Medicine in 2017 and is overseeing the development of a new school that will use many of the most innovative and effective educational practices available today to provide future physicians with the knowledge and skills needed to help transform healthcare and help people from all backgrounds and settings thrive.

Schuster is an active voice in research and advocacy on LGBTQ+ health and LGBTQ+ representation in medicine. His published speech, On Being Gay in Medicine, has been widely circulated and used as a teaching tool. In 2020, a 10-year retrospective on the piece was published in WBUR's CommonHealth Blog.

Honors 

 Elected member of the National Academy of Medicine
 Recipient of the Joseph W. St. Geme, Jr. Leadership Award from the Federation of Pediatric Organizations
 Former President of the Academic Pediatric Association
 Recipient of the Richardson Award for Lifetime Achievement from the Society for Pediatric Research
 Recipient of the Barger Excellence in Mentoring Award from Harvard Medical School
 Named among Modern Healthcare's 100 Most Influential People in Healthcare in 2018 and 2019
 Named among Modern Healthcare's 50 Most Influential Clinical Executives in 2019

References 

Living people
Year of birth missing (living people)
Yale College alumni
Harvard Kennedy School alumni
Harvard Medical School alumni
Gilman School alumni
American chief executives of education-related organizations
Members of the National Academy of Medicine
American pediatricians
People from Baltimore
American LGBT people
American physicians